Dubois' frog may refer to:

 Dubois' hill frog (Zakerana keralensis), a frog in the family Dicroglossidae from India
 Dubois' paa frog (Nanorana rostandi), a frog in the family Dicroglossidae endemic to western Nepal

Animal common name disambiguation pages